Influenster is a product discovery and reviews platform for consumers. Influenster uses social media analytics to measure its users’ influence on social media. Influenster launched in 2010. An iOS app for Influenster launched in 2014 while an Android app launched in 2015. As of January 2018, Influenster's community consisted of more than 4 million users. Influenster was acquired by Bazaarvoice in 2019, and the app was relaunched in October 2022.

Features

Influenster has a platform consisting of over 11 million reviews, with 880,000 new reviews generated each month. These products represent over 100K consumer brands with over 1.7 million product pages for users to review, ask/answer questions, and upload photos/videos of.

Based on a user's Impact score and supplied demographic information, they can be invited to Influenster campaigns. Influenster runs a variety of different types of campaigns, but they generally involve sending invited users a complimentary product or service to sample and discuss on social media. After sampling, the user is asked to complete a final market-research survey.

Influenster offers coupons and offers from partner retailers and brands that users can access through their product discovery experience on the platform. It uses Facebook, Twitter, Instagram, YouTube, Tumblr, Foursquare, Google+, a multi-platform blog widget, and friend referrals to determine Impact score. Impact points are largely calculated based on the number of followers or friends a user has on any given social network.

Influenster allows users to unlock "Expert" and "Lifestyle" badges through completing survey questions about their interests and behaviors, writing reviews on products, answering other users' questions, and sharing Influenster product pages across social media channels. These badges are a part of a gamification system to reward specific types of users with invites to specific Influenster campaigns matching their demographic.

Business model
The primary business model for Influenster involves brands working with Influenster through VoxBox or VirtualVox campaigns. In VoxBox or VirtualVox campaigns, brands will offer complimentary products or digital rewards to Influenster users who meet brand and product-specific criteria.

Series funding 
In 2016, Influenster raised $8 million in financing from Ebates, a leading online cashback shopping service.

See also
 Social Media Marketing
 Social Influence
 List of social networking websites

References

External links
 

American companies established in 2010
Web analytics
Social media companies
Social media management platforms
American review websites
2010 establishments in New York City